Zenwalk GNU/Linux is a desktop-focused Linux distribution founded by Jean-Philippe Guillemin. It is based on Slackware with very few modifications at system level making it 100% compatible with Slackware. It aims to be a modern, multi-purpose Linux distribution by focusing on internet applications, multimedia and programming tools. It comes with many specialized tools and is designed for beginner through advanced users, as it offers system configuration via both graphical tools and the command line.

History 
Zenwalk was originally called Minislack up to version 1.1. It was renamed with version 1.2, released on 12 August 2005. Originally using KDE as its desktop environment, it moved to Xfce with version 0.3, although GNOME and KDE packages have always been available separately.

Aims 

The Zenwalk Project aims to create a lightweight Linux distribution, through using only one application per task on the release ISO image; optimization for a specific instruction set architecture, to increase execution speed; and introducing a comprehensive package management system with dependency resolution.

Package management 

Zenwalk uses the netpkg package management system. Developed in-house, it provides the main functionality of the apt-get variety of package managers. It uses Slackware's .tgz package format, but adds dependency resolution capabilities. It uses meta files to provide dependency information, as well as package description during the install process. This convenience is available only to the official Zenwalk mirrors listed in the netpkg configuration file, netpkg.conf. In addition to the original netpkg command line interface, xnetpkg provides a GUI frontend with similar capabilities.

Zenwalk is also compatible with Slackware package management tools such as slapt-get and its frontends, and have similar functionality as that of netpkg.

As of Zenwalk 4.6, package compatibility with Slackware is still maintained. Slackware packages may be used in place of Zenwalk packages where necessary.

Supported architectures 
Starting with version 8.0, Zenwalk Linux is built and optimized primarily for the x86_64 architecture; 32-bit i486 architecture is no longer supported.

Project versions 

At one time there were five main versions of Zenwalk :

Zenwalk Standard, a distribution aimed at mainstream desktop and development use. Designed to be a stand-alone operating system, it installs to the hard drive by way of an ncurses-based installer. It includes all of the officially released software packages that are deemed most useful by the Zenwalk community. The default install also includes development packages like gcc, and some proprietary media packages (such as Adobe Flash Player) and drivers in order to provide a full featured default install. The default desktop environment is Xfce.
Zenwalk Core (discontinued), a Zenwalk system built for user customization. Released with no X Window System binaries, its aim was to allow a skilled user to build a system fit for their needs.  The project's lead developer was Emmanuel Bailleul.
ZenLive (discontinued), a Zenwalk system built on a Live CD design.  ZenLive followed the progress made by the full Zenwalk system closely, thus mirroring the version number, and attempted to stay true to the original distribution's goals.  In addition, it included all of the necessary libraries and applications to develop and compile software, a particularly rare feature in Live CD distributions. The original ZenLive team left the project after version 6.0 was released but ZenwalkLive project was revived by an enthusiastic user and developed as a one-man-project.  With version 6.4 the live-framework changed from deprecated linux-live-scripts to slackware-live-scripts.
Zenwalk Gnome (discontinued), with GNOME as the default desktop environment.
Zenwalk Openbox (discontinued), supplied with Openbox as stand-alone window manager. It was a very lightweight version of the operating system and did not use LXDE in its choice of software. It still uses Thunar File Manager over PCManFM which is standard on LXDE-based systems such as Lubuntu.

Derivatives 
There are currently three known Zenwalk-based distributions:
Arudius, a now-discontinued live CD distribution for information assurance with tools for penetration testing and vulnerability analysis
SLAMPP, intended to be used as a home server
Zencafe, an Indonesian distribution designed for internet cafes

Live USB
A Live USB of Zenwalk Linux for versions up to 5.2 can be created manually or with UNetbootin. Current versions of Zenwalk can also booted from a USB using Ventoy, but only for installation, not a live session.

See also 

Slackware

Notes

References

External links 

 
 
 Zenwalk 4.8 Review at Tech Source from Bohol
 Zenwalk in Tomsk (Siberian, Russia)
 Zenwalk Linux 15.0 First Review

Slackware
Linux distributions without systemd
Linux distributions
Rolling Release Linux distributions